Events in the year 2021 in the Comoros.

Incumbents
President: Azali Assoumani
President of the Assembly: Moustadroine Abdou

Events
Ongoing — COVID-19 pandemic in the Comoros

Deaths

References

2021 in the Comoros
2020s in the Comoros
Years of the 21st century in the Comoros
Comoros
Comoros